|}

The Rising Stars Novices' Chase is a Grade 2 National Hunt steeplechase in Great Britain which is open to horses aged four years or older. It is run at Wincanton over a distance of about 2 miles and 4 furlongs (2 miles 4 furlongs and 35 yards, or 4,225 metres), and during its running there are seventeen fences to be jumped. The race is for novice chasers, and it is scheduled to take place each year in early November.

The race was first run in 1990 and was initially held at Chepstow, where it was contested over 2 miles and 3½ furlongs in February.  It was switched to be run in November from 1994. 
The race was transferred to Wincanton and extended to its present length in 2004.

Winners

See also
 Horse racing in Great Britain
 List of British National Hunt races

References
 Racing Post:

 pedigreequery.com – Rising Stars Novices' Chase – Wincanton.

National Hunt races in Great Britain
Wincanton Racecourse
National Hunt chases